Wajahat Rauf is a Pakistani director, actor, screenwriter, producer and musician. 

He has directed and produced commercially successful films, including Karachi Se Lahore (2015), Lahore Se Aagey (2016), Chhalawa (2019) and Parde Mein Rehne Do (2022). Rauf has also produced several popular TV dramas including Raqs-e-Bismil (2021). He is the host and creator of a highly popular YouTube show Voice Over Man.

Career
Wajahat Rauf was the channel head of AAG TV, a youth entertainment channel with particular attention given to music, and he himself released a song in 2011, Shikwa. The later being the OST for the youth series Kiya Life Hai aired on ARY Digital. He has produced over 26 television dramas.

Film career 
Rauf made his debut as a film director with Karachi Se Lahore in 2015, which grossed 10.5 crore at box-office. He made his second film in 2016, which was titled Lahore Se Aagey, which grossed 21.6 crore at box-office. In 2019, he directed Chhalawa which was also a box-office success. His 4th film, Parde Mein Rehne Do was released on May 3rd 2022 and received critical acclaim from major publications.

Filmography

Television

Film

Web

Discography

Singles
 Shikwa (2011)
 Waada (2013)
 Talaash (2018) ft. Aashir Wajahat, his son

Awards and nominations

Lux Style Awards

See also
List of film directors
List of Pakistani television directors

References

External links
 
 Wajahat Rauf on YouTube

Living people
1976 births
Film directors from Karachi
Pakistani television directors
Sindhi people